Satyr is a 1996 pornographic film directed by Michael Zen. It was written by Raven Touchstone and stars Jenna Jameson, Asia Carrera, Missy, Brad Armstrong, and Mickey G.

Plot
Fawn Deering (Jenna Jameson) is a college student researching animal mythology and human sexuality. This project leads her to Dr. Jade (Asia Carrera) for an interview on the subject. While at Dr. Jade's Manor, she meets Adam (Brad Armstrong) and is immediately drawn to him. Sophie the maid (Missy) warns her to leave Jade Manor and never look back, but Fawn cannot resist Adam's invitation to return that weekend to observe a bacchanal. Sophie tries to get Adam to leave Fawn alone and not share their curse, but Adam has fallen in love with her and does not want to live without her. Unfortunately, this means that Fawn will have to become a Satyr like the rest of them. While the transformation takes place, Fawn spends most of her time sleeping and having visions where she sees Adam is his Satyr form. After Fawn is completely transformed, she journeys into Adam's room where they profess their love for each other. Adam finally realizes that he is cursing Fawn for the rest of her lifetime, and sets out to return her to human form.

Cast
Jenna Jameson as Fawn Deering
Asia Carrera as Dr. Jade
Missy as Sophie
Brad Armstrong as Adam
Mickey G as Daniel
Chloe as bacchanal participant
Stacy Valentine as bacchanal participant
Mark Davis  as bacchanal participant
Peter North  as bacchanal participant
Tom Byron as bacchanal participant

Scene breakdowns
 Scene 1: Asia Carrera, Mickey G, Brad Armstrong.
 Scene 2: Asia Carrera, Mickey G.
 Scene 3: Jenna Jameson, Missy.
 Scene 4: Chloe, Mark Davis.
 Scene 5: Jenna Jameson, Mickey G, Brad Armstrong.
 Scene 6: Asia Carrera, Missy.
 Scene 7: Stacy Valentine, Peter North, Tom Byron.
 Scene 8: Jenna Jameson, Brad Armstrong.

Awards and nominations

References

External links
 

1996 films
1990s English-language films
1990s pornographic films
American pornographic films
1990s American films